{{Automatic taxobox
| image = 
| image_caption =
| display_parents = 2
| taxon = Facelis
| authority = Cass.
| type_species = 'Facelis apiculata(syn of F. retusa)| type_species_authority = Cass.
}}Facelis (trampweed) is a genus of South American flowering plants in the family Asteraceae.Tropicos, Facelis Cass.

 Species
 Facelis brachyantha Macloskie - Patagonia
 Facelis lasiocarpa (Griseb.) Cabrera - Peru, Ecuador, Bolivia, Argentina
 Facelis plumosa (Wedd.) Sch.Bip. - Peru, Bolivia, Argentina (Jujuy Province), Chile (Tarapaca Region)
 Facelis retusa'' (Lam.) Sch.Bip.  - Brazil, Bolivia, Paraguay, Uruguay, northern Argentina, Chile; naturalized in parts of Africa, Australia, and North America

References

Gnaphalieae
Asteraceae genera
Flora of South America
Taxa named by Henri Cassini